Yervandashat is a village in the Armavir Province of Armenia. The village has a ruined basilica dated to the 4th or 5th century and the Saint Shushanik church of the 10th to 17th century. Along the main highway leading to and from the area are khachkar monuments. It is named after the nearby Armenian historic city of Yervandashat

1 km east of the modern village -within the Turkish borders- are the ruins of ancient Yervandashat, a city founded by King Orontes IV (the last of the Orontid Dynasty), in 210 BC. The ancient town sits upon an escarpment overlooking the junction of the Arax River and Akhurian River. According to Movses Khorenatsi, Orontes founded Yervandashat to replace Armavir as his capital after Armavir had been left dry by a shift of the Arax River.

Ancient Yervandashat was destroyed by the army of the Persian King Shapur II in the 360s.

However, The archaeological site has not been subject of major research, but preliminarily, the fortifications and some remains of palaces have been uncovered.

See also 
Armavir Province

References 

The Kingdom of Armenia By Mack Chahin
History of Armenia, by Moses of Chorene

External links 

 About Yervandashat

Populated places in Armavir Province
Populated places established in the 3rd century BC